Templemania sarothrura is a species of moth of the family Tortricidae. It is found in Mexico (Distrito Federal, Veracruz).

References

Moths described in 1875
Atteriini